In ring theory, a branch of mathematics, the Skolem–Noether theorem characterizes the automorphisms of simple rings. It is a fundamental result in the theory of central simple algebras.

The theorem was first published by Thoralf Skolem in 1927 in his paper Zur Theorie der assoziativen Zahlensysteme (German: On the theory of associative number systems) and later rediscovered by Emmy Noether.

Statement 
In a general formulation, let A and B be simple unitary rings, and let k be the center of B. The center k is a field since given x nonzero in k, the simplicity of B implies that the nonzero two-sided ideal  is the whole of B, and hence that x is a unit. If the dimension of B over k is finite, i.e. if B is a central simple algebra of finite dimension, and A is also a k-algebra, then given k-algebra homomorphisms

f, g : A → B,

there exists a unit b in B such that for all a in A

g(a) = b · f(a) · b−1.

In particular, every automorphism of a central simple k-algebra is an inner automorphism.

Proof 
First suppose . Since  the map f is injective by simplicity of A, so A is also finite-dimensional. Since they have the same dimension, it follows that there is an isomorphism of A-modules . For the general case,  is a matrix algebra and that  is simple. By the first part applied to the maps , there exists  such that

Taking , we find

for all z. Taking  this time we find
,
which is what was sought.

Notes

References 
 
 A discussion in Chapter IV of Milne, class field theory 
 
 

Theorems in ring theory